Costacaridae is a family of mites in the order Mesostigmata.

Species
Costacaridae contains one genus, with one recognized species:

 Genus Costacarus P. E. Hunter, 1993
 Costacarus reyesi P. E. Hunter, 1993

References

Mesostigmata
Acari families